Yaime Pérez Tellez (sometimes "Yaimí", born 29 May 1991) is a Cuban athlete specialising in the discus throw. In 2022, she defected to the United States.

Career
She was the gold medallist at the 2010 World Junior Championships in Athletics, then won her first senior title at the regional 2011 ALBA Games. Pérez represented Cuba at the 2013 World Championships in Athletics, placing eleventh in the final. Her 2014 season was highlighted by a silver medal at the Central American and Caribbean Games and a fifth-place finish at the 2014 IAAF Continental Cup.

Pérez won the gold medal at the 2019 World Championships and the bronze medal at the 2020 Summer Olympics.

She defected to the United States while on a stopover in Miami, after performing at the 2022 World Athletics Championships in Eugene, Oregon where she placed seventh in the competition.

Personal bests
Shot put:  (2008)
Discus throw:  (2019)

International competitions

1Representing the Americas

2No mark in the final

References

External links

1991 births
Living people
Sportspeople from Santiago de Cuba
Cuban female discus throwers
Olympic athletes of Cuba
Athletes (track and field) at the 2012 Summer Olympics
Athletes (track and field) at the 2016 Summer Olympics
Athletes (track and field) at the 2015 Pan American Games
Athletes (track and field) at the 2019 Pan American Games
Pan American Games gold medalists for Cuba
Pan American Games silver medalists for Cuba
World Athletics Championships athletes for Cuba
World Athletics Championships medalists
World Athletics Championships winners
Pan American Games medalists in athletics (track and field)
Central American and Caribbean Games gold medalists for Cuba
Competitors at the 2014 Central American and Caribbean Games
Competitors at the 2018 Central American and Caribbean Games
Defecting sportspeople of Cuba
Diamond League winners
IAAF Continental Cup winners
Pan American Games gold medalists in athletics (track and field)
Central American and Caribbean Games medalists in athletics
Medalists at the 2015 Pan American Games
Medalists at the 2019 Pan American Games
Athletes (track and field) at the 2020 Summer Olympics
Medalists at the 2020 Summer Olympics
Olympic bronze medalists in athletics (track and field)
Olympic bronze medalists for Cuba
21st-century Cuban women